Anacaona (1474?–1504), or Golden Flower, was a Taíno cacica, or female cacique (chief), religious expert, poet and composer born in Xaragua. Before the arrival of Christopher Columbus in 1492, Ayiti or Quisqueya to the Taínos (the Spaniards named it La Española, i.e., Hispaniola — now known as the Dominican Republic and Haiti) was divided into five kingdoms, i.e., Xaragua, Maguana, Higüey, Maguá and Marién. Anacaona was born into a family of caciques. She was the sister of Bohechío, the ruler of Xaragua.

She succeeded Bohechío as cacica after his death. Under Anacaona's rule, the Spanish settlers and the Taínos of Xaragua coexisted and intermarried.

In 1503, Nicolás Ovando, the governor of the island, visited Xaragua. He suspected an insurrection was brewing among the Taíno chiefs, including Anacaona, presently  in the kingdom. Ovando gave the order for the caciques to be captured and burned. Anacaona was hanged.

Early life and family
Anacaona was born in Yaguana (present day Léogâne, Haiti), the capital of Little Spain,  in 1474 (?). Anacaona's brother Bohechío was a local chieftain. He extended his rule in 1475 to include all territories west of Xaragua. Through consolidation of his influence and power, Bohechío married Anacaona to Caonabo, cacique of Maguana. Together they had one daughter, Higüemota.

On December 4, 1492, Christopher Columbus arrived in the kingdom of Marién at present-day Mole St Nicholas, Haiti. He was in search of a direct route to the Indies (India). Upon arrival, he was greeted by the Tainos, who were much smaller in stature compared to the Spaniards. Columbus was gifted with gold, corn, and other items. In 1493, the Spanish Crown established a colony whose sole purpose was to excavate for gold and other precious metals. With the establishment of the new colony Santo Domingo , the Taíno were kidnapped and enslaved to satisfy the needs of the Crown (many Taíno women were raped and those Taínos who resisted the Spaniards were murdered).

In 1493, Caonabo was arrested for ordering the destruction of La Navidad (a Spanish colony in the northwestern part of the island) and its people. He was shipped to Spain and died in a shipwreck during the journey. When Caonabo was captured, Anacaona returned to Xaragua and served as an advisor to Bohechío.

In 1498, Bohechío was confronted by Bartholomew Columbus, brother of Christopher Columbus and founder of the city of Santo Domingo, who arrived in Xaragua with his troops to subdue Bohechío and conquer his territory. The purpose of the Spaniards in so doing was to acquire gold. With his power weakened, Bohechío, advised by Anacaona, decided to recognize the sovereignty of the Catholic Monarchs. Instead of fighting, he committed himself to paying the tribute levied by the Spaniards with products such as cotton, bread, corn and fish.

After Bohechío's death in 1500, Anacaona ruled as cacica until her execution in 1503.

Arrest and death

 
In the fall of 1503, Governor Nicolás Ovando and his party of 300 traveled on foot to Xaragua. They were received in a lavish ceremony by Anacaona, her nobles, and several Taíno chiefs.

While the Taíno presented the reception as a gesture of welcome, the Spanish saw it as being an elaborate distraction. Ovando's party was under the impression that Anacaona and the Taíno chiefs present at the reception were planning an insurrection. Ovando lured the chiefs into a caney (large hut) for a Spanish tournament and gave the signal for the Spaniards to seize and bind the caciques. They were burned in the caney while other Taínos of lower rank were slaughtered outside. Anacaona was hanged.

According to historian Troy S. Floyd, the accuracy of the accounts of this event remain uncertain for many reasons. For one, even though the separate accounts made it seem as though it was a perfectly segregated fight along racial lines, the two groups had coexisted and intermarried for six years prior. As such, there was a history of harmonious relations between the two races. For another, it is unclear why the Spaniards would lure the Taínos into a trap. Additionally, fifty Spaniards were killed; this is a high number of casualties considering that the Europeans deployed superior military technology. Finally, the Xaragua caciques were respected as some of the most intelligent on the island and it is unlikely that they could be lured into a hut if they were planning their own revolt.

According to Sir Arthur Help's book The Spanish Conquest in America (1855), Nicolás Ovando renamed the place where Anacaona was murdered “The City of True Peace” (La Villa de la Vera Paz), "...in honor of his recent triumph". The arms assigned to the city were "...a rainbow and a cross, with a dove bearing the olive branch!".

Legacy and influence 
Anacaona, as a poet and composer, is accordingly memorialized in contemporary art and literature across the Caribbean region. A statue commemorating her legacy is in Léogâne, Haiti. The tallest building in the Caribbean, Torre Anacaona 27, is named after her, in the Dominican Republic. The song Anacaona, lead vocals by Cheo Feliciano,  popularizes her story.

Literature 

 The Royal Diaries series, Anacaona: Golden Flower, Haiti, 1490 by Edwidge Danticat
 Anacaona, la Reine Taino d'Ayiti by Maryse N. Roumain, PhD.

Music 

 "Anacaona", by Ansy and Yole Dérose 
 "Anacaona", by Super Sonic de Larose 
 "Anacaona", by Eddy Francois 
 "Anacaona", composed by Tite Curet Alonso 
 "Anacaona", by Irka Mateo 
 "Anacaona", sung by Cheo Feliciano

See also
Chiefdoms of Hispaniola
Enriquillo
Anti-Colonialism
List of Taínos
Female Native American leaders

Notes

References
 
Bartolomé de las Casas: A Short Account of the Destruction of the Indies.
Peter Martyr d'Anghiera: De Orbe Novo.
 Samuel M. Wilson: Hispaniola - Caribbean Chiefdoms in the Age of Columbus. The University of Alabama Press, 1990. .
Attribution

External links
 The Louverture Project: Anacaona
 Songs (salsa) about Anacaona (Cheo Feliciano and the Fania All Stars): Anacaona 
anacaona the golden flower book

1474 births
1504 deaths
History of the Dominican Republic
Indigenous Caribbean people
15th-century rulers
15th-century women rulers
16th-century rulers
16th-century women rulers
Female Native American leaders
Taíno leaders
Haitian people of Taíno descent
Resistance to colonialism
Executed Native American people
History of Puerto Rico
History of Haiti
15th-century Native Americans
15th-century Native American women
16th-century Native Americans
16th-century Native American women
16th-century Haitian people